Bernisse is a former municipality in the western Netherlands, in the province of South Holland. Since 2015 it has been a part of the municipality of Nissewaard.

The former municipality was named after the river Bernisse, which flows right through it from the Spui to the Brielse Meer and separates the estuary islands of Voorne and Putten.

The former municipality of Bernisse consisted of the following communities: Abbenbroek, Biert, Geervliet, Heenvliet, Oudenhoorn, Simonshaven, Zuidland.

The municipality of Bernisse was formed on January 1, 1980, through the amalgamation of the municipalities Abbenbroek, Oudenhoorn, Zuidland, and parts of the municipalities Geervliet (including Simonshaven) and Heenvliet.

Topography

Dutch Topographic map of the former municipality of Bernisse, 2013.

Notable people 
 Dirk van Hogendorp (1761 in Heenvliet – 1822) a somewhat "troublesome" Dutch officer and author
 Maarten den Bakker (born 1969 in Abbenbroek) a retired road bicycle racer, competed in the 1988 Summer Olympics
 Alexander van Oudenaarden (1970 in Zuidland) a Dutch biophysicist and systems biologist
 Chanella Stougje (born 1996 in Zuidland) a Dutch professional racing cyclist

References

External links

1980 establishments in the Netherlands
States and territories established in 1980
Municipalities of the Netherlands disestablished in 2015
Former municipalities of South Holland
Nissewaard